Crystallography is a book of poetry and prose published in 1994 and revised in 2003 by Canadian author Christian Bök.  Based around a  that language is a crystallization process, the book includes several forms of poetry including concrete poetry, as well as pseudohistorical texts, diagrams, charts, and English gematria.

Major poems in the book include Geodes and Diamonds.

Bök explains the title in an introduction.  Crystallography refers to both the science of crystallography and a reanalysis of the word's roots: crystal meaning "clear", and "graph" meaning "writing":

References
Bök, Christian. Crystallography. Toronto: Coach House Press, 2003(2nd. Ed.).
Writing with images. (n.d.). from http://writingwithimages.com/2-3-christian-bok-crystallography/ 

1994 books
1994 poetry books
Canadian poetry collections
Coach House Press books